Empires was an indie rock band from Chicago, Illinois. The band consisted of Tom Conrad, Sean Van Vleet, Max Steger, and Mike Robinson.

Background
In early 2008, Empires was formed when longtime friends guitarist Tom Conrad approached singer Sean Van Vleet about writing music together. Conrad and Van Vleet spent the year writing music together, and the induction of the other band members soon followed, Max Steger, Ryan Luciani and Al Smith.  The band's name, "Empires", was thought of by Tom Conrad and Sean Van Vleet at the same time, albeit on opposite sides of Chicago (Tom was on the 'L' Train at the time, while Sean was at their shared apartment).

The band has consistently mentioned having a very DIY ethic when it comes to recording and releasing music with Max Steger as their producer / engineer, Tom Conrad as a designer and Sean Van Vleet as a writer.  In 2014, the band's third full-length studio album, Orphan, was produced by John Congleton and released on Island Records / Chop Shop Records.

Empires made their national television debut on David Letterman on June 17, 2014.

Lead singer Sean Van Vleet confirmed in an Instagram comment on August 23, 2017 that the band was no longer making music.

Discography
HOWL (2008) 
BANG EP (2010)
Garage Hymns (2012)
How Good Does It Feel EP (2014)
Orphan (2014)

Tour history
Empires has performed and toured alongside such artists: Geographer, Alkaline Trio, Kaiser Chiefs, The Whigs, Augustines, Deerhunter, Saint Motel, A Silent Film, Death Cab for Cutie, The Temper Trap, Margot & the Nuclear So and So's, Black Francis, and Chain Gang of 1974.

Austin City Limits Music Festival (2014)
Bunbury Music Festival (2013)
Big Guava Music Festival (2015)
Bonnaroo Music Festival (2014)
BottleRock Napa Valley (2014)
Hangout Music Festival (2014)
Forecastle Festival (2015)
Lollapalooza (2012)
LouFest (2014)
South by Southwest (2014)

References 

Musical groups from Chicago
Indie rock musical groups from Illinois
Musical groups established in 2008
2008 establishments in Illinois
Musical groups disestablished in 2015
2015 disestablishments in Illinois